County Londonderry was a constituency represented in the Irish House of Commons until 1800.

Members of Parliament
1613–1615: John Baker and John Rowley
1634–1635: Tristram Beresford and George Cary
1639–1649: Henry Conway and Edward Rowley
1656–1658 (Second Protectorate Parliament): Tristram Beresford and Thomas Newburgh
1661–1666: (Sir) Tristram Beresford and Sir John Rowley

1692–1801

Notes

References

Constituencies of the Parliament of Ireland (pre-1801)
Historic constituencies in County Londonderry
1800 disestablishments in Ireland
Constituencies disestablished in 1800